Dominik Peter (born 30 May 2001) is a Swiss Ski jumper. He competed in the 2022 Winter Olympics. He currently resides in Einsiedeln

References

External links

2001 births
Living people
Swiss male ski jumpers
Ski jumpers at the 2022 Winter Olympics
Olympic ski jumpers of Switzerland
Sportspeople from Zürich